Morisita's overlap index, named after Masaaki Morisita, is a statistical measure of dispersion of individuals in a population.  It is used to compare overlap among samples (Morisita 1959).  This formula is based on the assumption that increasing the size of the samples will increase the diversity because it will include different habitats (i.e. different faunas).

Formula:

 

 xi is the number of times species i is represented in the total X from one sample.
 yi is the number of times species i is represented in the total Y from another sample.
 Dx and Dy are the Simpson's index values for the x and y samples respectively.
 S is the number of unique species

CD = 0 if the two samples do not overlap in terms of species, and CD = 1 if the species occur in the same proportions in both samples.

Horn's modification of the index is (Horn 1966):

Note, not to be confused with Morisita’s index of dispersion.

References 

 Morisita, M. (1959). "Measuring of the dispersion and analysis of distribution patterns". Memoires of the Faculty of Science, Kyushu University, Series E. Biology. 2: 215–235.
 Morisita, M. (1962).  "Iδ-Index, A Measure of Dispersion of Individuals".  Researches on Population Ecology, 4 (1), 1–7.
 Horn, H. S. (1966). Measurement of "Overlap" in comparative ecological studies. The American Naturalist 100:419-424. 
 Linton, L. R.; Davies, Ronald W.; Wrona, F. J. (1981) "Resource Utilization Indices: An Assessment", Journal of Animal Ecology, 50 (1), 283-292 
 Ricklefs, Robert E.; Lau, Michael (1980) "Bias and Dispersion of Overlap Indices: Results of Some Monte Carlo Simulations", Ecology, 61 (5), 1019-1024 
 Garratt, Michael W.;  Steinhorst, R. Kirk (1976). "Testing for significance of Morisita’s, Horn’s and related measures of overlap".  American Midland Naturalist 96 (1), 245-251

External links 
 Community Metrics
 Masaaki MORISITA

Population ecology
Ecological metrics